Anthony Gruszka was a member of the Wisconsin State Assembly.

Biography
Gruszka was born on January 14, 1910, in Milwaukee, Wisconsin. Later, he moved to Mosinee, Wisconsin. He died on November 4, 1972, in La Crosse, Wisconsin.

Career
Gruszka was a member of the Assembly from 1939 to 1940. In 1954, he was a candidate in the Republican primary for the United States House of Representatives from Wisconsin's 4th congressional district. He lost to John C. Schafer.

References

Politicians from Milwaukee
People from Mosinee, Wisconsin
Republican Party members of the Wisconsin State Assembly
1910 births
1972 deaths
20th-century American politicians